Gordon Leslie Barnhart  (born  January 22, 1945) is a former Clerk of the Senate of Canada and the Saskatchewan Legislature, as well as former Secretary of the University of Saskatchewan. He was the 20th Lieutenant-Governor of Saskatchewan from 2006 until 2012. He was the interim President of the University of Saskatchewan as from May 21, 2014 until October 24, 2015.

Biography
Barnhart was born in Saltcoats, Saskatchewan. He completed his Bachelor of Arts in history in 1967 and in 1968, he took a job teaching grades 10 and 11 history at North Battleford Collegiate Institute (now North Battleford Comprehensive High School). In 1968, after only four months of teaching, he was appointed Clerk of the Saskatchewan Legislative Assembly, the youngest to take on such a position across the Commonwealth. During his tenure, he worked on his Master of Arts at the University of Regina, completing it in 1977.

In 1989, Governor General Jeanne Sauvé, on the advice of Prime Minister Brian Mulroney, appointed Barnhart to Clerk of the Senate, and thereby Clerk of the Parliaments. After five years, which included contributing to the failed Charlottetown Accord, he resigned from his position in the Senate. He returned to the University of Saskatchewan, where he completed his Doctorate in 1998.

From 2000 to 2005, he served as Secretary of the University of Saskatchewan. He retired to teach political studies classes, specializing in Canadian politics, government and the Canadian Senate.

In 2001, Barnhart's book Peace, Progress and Prosperity, which provided the first detailed biography of Saskatchewan's first premier, Thomas Walter Scott, was first published. Some of his other works include Saskatchewan's Premiers of the Twentieth Century, Building for the Future; a photo journal of Saskatchewan's Legislative Building and Parliamentary Committees: Enhancing Democratic Governance.

On April 28, 2006, Canadian Prime Minister Stephen Harper announced that Gordon Barnhart would replace Lynda Haverstock as Lieutenant-Governor of Saskatchewan. He was sworn in on August 1, 2006. Barnhart's term ended on March 22, 2012, when he was replaced by Vaughn Solomon Schofield.

The University of Saskatchewan announced that Barnhart would return to the faculty of the Department of History as of April 1, 2012 as an adjunct professor.

On May 21, 2014, it was announced that Barnhart had been appointed interim President at the University of Saskatchewan to replace Ilene Busch-Vishniac who was fired. He served as interim president until October 24, 2015, when he was succeeded by Peter Stoicheff.

On June 30, 2014, Barnhart was named a Member of the Order of Canada.

As mayor of the town of Saltcoats, Barnhart has served as the president of the organization of Municipalities of Saskatchewan from 2017 - 2021. During his 2021 re-election for the Municipalities of Saskatchewan presidency, Barnhart was found to be vacationing in Hawaii despite the ongoing COVID-19 pandemic and the border between the United States and Canada being closed to nonessential travel. Barnhart lost his re-election bid by an overwhelming margin, receiving 115 votes compared to the victor, Rodger Hayward's 351 votes.

As Lieutenant-Governor

As lieutenant-governor, Barnhart carries out such duties as reading throne speeches, swearing in premiers and cabinet ministers, opening legislative sessions, approving legislation and bestowing honours to Saskatchewan citizens.

Upon being sworn in, Barnhart expressed his respect and admiration for his predecessors. As an academic, he expects to focus his efforts on education. He also plans on travelling a great deal to continue the office's accessibility to average Saskatchewanians provided by Haverstock.

Barnhart hosted hundreds of visitors on the occasion of his first New Year's Levee at Government House in 2007, a traditional event that lieutenant-governors in Regina have hosted since 1884.

Barnhart also initiated the "Lieutenant-Governor's Leadership Forum", which will accept eighteen grade 11 and 12 students each year from 2007 till 2011 to tour the province, meet successful leaders in various fields, and to develop the students' own leadership abilities.

Additional roles
Visitor to the University of Saskatchewan
Visitor to the University of Regina

Patronage
Saskatchewan Brain Injury Association
Canadians Clubs of Saskatchewan
Canadian Parents for French
Canadian Peony Society Show, Regina, 2008
Conexus Arts Centre, Regina
Saskatchewan Craft Council
Saskatchewan Elocution and Debate Association
International Biology Olympiad, Saskatoon, 2007
Lung Association of Saskatchewan
Luther College, Regina
Monarchist League of Canada
Saskatchewan Music Festivals Association
Saskatchewan Poet Laureate Program
Lyric Musical Theatre (formerly Regina Lyric Light Opera)
Saskatchewan Youth Parliament
Saskatchewan Architectural Heritage Society

Arms

See also
Monarchy in Saskatchewan
Government House (Saskatchewan)

References

External links
 Official website of the Lieutenant Governor of Saskatchewan
"Barnhart says he has big shoes to fill" by Sarah Macdonald, The Leader-Post, July 31, 2006, retrieved August 1, 2006,
"Lieutenant-Governor of Saskatchewan"  retrieved December 18, 2006,
Office of the Lieutenant-Governor of Saskatchewan
Barnhart Becomes Lieutenant-Governor (2006)
Feature interview with the Sheaf newspaper (2007)

20th-century Canadian civil servants
21st-century Canadian historians
Canadian male non-fiction writers
Historians of Canada
Lieutenant Governors of Saskatchewan
Members of the Saskatchewan Order of Merit
Presidents of the University of Saskatchewan
University of Saskatchewan alumni
Living people
1945 births
People from Saltcoats, Saskatchewan
Members of the Order of Canada
Legislative clerks